Entertainer of the Year is the twenty-second solo studio album by American country music singer-songwriter Loretta Lynn. It was released on February 26, 1973, by MCA Records. This was Lynn's first album with MCA following Decca's consolidation into the MCA label.

This album was titled Entertainer of the Year after Lynn received the Entertainer of the Year award from the Country Music Association the previous year, becoming the first woman to win that award.

Critical reception
In the March 10, 1973 issue, Billboard published a review that said, "One of the more remarkable things about this album is its ability to demonstrate Miss Lynn as a blues singer. On a few of the cuts, her blues are superb. There are more sides of Loretta here than we're used to, and they're good." The review also noted "Hanky Panky Woman", "I'm All He's Got", and "Possessions" as the best cuts on the album.

Cashbox published a review in the March 17 issue which said, "Although Loretta's latest is titled after her recent country music award, it would not be overstating matters to claim that she is the entertainer of any year. This album continues her already established fine tradition of recording the best country material available and delivering it with the style and grace that only she can. Included are her current hit, "Rated "X"", "Legend in My Mind", "Hanky Panky Woman", and "Possessions". A sure fire winner in, and for, the Entertainer of the Year."

Commercial performance 

The album peaked at No. 1 on the US Billboard Hot Country LP's chart.

The album's only single, "Rated "X"", was released in November 1972 and peaked atop the US Billboard Hot Country Singles chart. The single also peaked at No. 1 in Canada on the RPM Country Singles chart.

Recording 
Recording sessions for the album took place on August 21 and December 12, 1972, at Bradley's Barn in Mount Juliet, TN. Three songs on the album were recorded during previous sessions. "Hanky Panky Woman" was recorded during the August 19, 1970 session for 1970's Coal Miner's Daughter. "Rated "X"" is the only song ever released of the three songs recorded during the session on August 24, 1971. "Legend in My Mind" was recorded on April 25, 1972, during a session for 1972's Here I Am Again.

Track listing

Personnel
Adapted from the album liner notes and MCA recording session records.
Harold Bradley – bass guitar
Owen Bradley – producer
Ray Edenton – acoustic guitar
Buddy Harman – drums
Darrell Johnson - mastering
The Jordanaires – background vocals
Loretta Lynn – lead vocals
Grady Martin – guitar
Charlie McCoy – harmonica, vibes
Bob Moore – bass
Doctor Elkin L. Rippy – liner notes
Hargus Robbins – piano
Hal Rugg – steel, dobro
Jerry Shook – guitar
Jerry Smith – piano
Herman Wade – guitar
Pete Wade – guitar

Charts
Album

Singles

References 

1973 albums
Loretta Lynn albums
Albums produced by Owen Bradley
MCA Records albums